The individual show jumping in equestrian at the 1936 Olympic Games in Berlin was held at the Olympiastadion (jumping) on 16 August. The competition was also referred to as the "Prix des Nations." There were 54 competitors from 18 nations, with each nation having a team of three riders. The results of the individual event were used for the team jumping event as well. The individual event was won by Kurt Hasse of Germany, the nation's first victory in individual jumping and first medal in the event since 1912. Romania and Hungary each earned their first individual jumping medals, the former with Henri Rang's silver and the latter with József von Platthy's bronze.

Background

This was the seventh appearance of the event, which had first been held at the 1900 Summer Olympics and has been held at every Summer Olympics at which equestrian sports have been featured (that is, excluding 1896, 1904, and 1908). It is the oldest event on the current programme, the only one that was held in 1900.

Three of the 11 riders from the 1932 competition returned: gold medalist Takeichi Nishi of Japan, fourth-place finisher William Bradford of the United States, and non-finisher Arne Francke of Sweden. 

Romania and Turkey each made their debut in the event. Belgium, France, and Sweden competed for the sixth time, tied for the most of any nation; Sweden had missed only the inaugural 1900 competition, while Belgium and France missed the individual jumping in 1932.

Competition format

The team and individual jumping competitions used the same scores. A single round of jumping was held.

The jumping test featured 20 obstacles and had a time limit of 160 seconds. Points were lost for faults (including elimination for the third refusal on the course) and for exceeding the time limit. The schedule of faults was:
 3 points: first disobedience
 4 points: upsetting obstacle, touching water
 6 points: second disobedience, fall of horse
 10 points: fall of rider
 1/4 point: every second above 160

Ties for medals were determined by jump-off; other ties were not broken. In the jump-off, there was no time limit but instead the time was used as a tie-breaker if pairs had the same number of faults.

Schedule

Results

 Gold jump-off

 Bronze jump-off

References

Equestrian at the Summer Olympics